California Certified Organic Farmers (CCOF) is a United States Department of Agriculture (USDA)-accredited organic certifying agency and trade association, located in Santa Cruz, California. Formed in 1973, CCOF was the first organic certification entity in the United States.

CCOF includes three legally distinct entities. CCOF, Inc. is governed by a board of directors, and provides infrastructure for the certification, advocacy, and Foundation programs, and also supports a regional chapter system for its members. CCOF Certification Services, LLC, governed by the LLC management committee, is a USDA National Organic Program (NOP)-accredited organic certification agency. The CCOF Foundation is a nonprofit foundation that includes educational programs, grants for students and teachers, consumer education campaigns, and hardship assistance for organic farmers.

CCOF Certification Services, LLC offers organic certification to the USDA NOP standards to farms, livestock operations, processors, private labelers, brokers and retailers throughout the United States, Canada, and Mexico.

See also
Organic food
Organic farming

References

External links

Organic food certification organizations
Organizations based in California
Agriculture in California
Agricultural marketing organizations
Santa Cruz, California
1973 establishments in California
Product certification
Organic farming in the United States
Organizations established in 1973
Agricultural marketing in the United States